David James Schuler (born August 1, 1982) is an American, two-time Grammy Award nominated, multi-platinum worldwide selling record producer, songwriter, film composer and filmmaker from Rochester, NY. Currently residing in Los Angeles, CA, Schuler has produced records and written songs with artists such as P!nk, John Legend, Daughtry, New Politics, Backstreet Boys, The Saturdays, Scott Stapp, Ricki-Lee Coulter, Esmee Denters, Lauren Bennett, Teddy Geiger, Shy Carter, Aimee Proal, and others.

Additionally, Schuler co-wrote over 52 songs and served as music supervisor for 'Do, Re & Mi', an animated series on Amazon Prime starring Kristen Bell, Jackie Tohn and Luke Youngblood. The series was created by Michael Scharf and Jackie Tohn, who also co-wrote each original song with Schuler.

Brand music 
In addition to writing and producing for various recording artists, Schuler has also composed campaign music for over 50 national brands such as Amazon, Porsche, Yahoo, Budweiser, Dropbox, NFL, MLB, WWE, Nutrish, Mattel, Claire's, Hard Rock Cafe, Meineke, Take 5, BB&T and many more.

Film career 
Much like many Filmmakers of his generation, David began making films at a young age on his Father's VHS camcorder. Stating that his passion for genre film and dark/heavy music fully manifested in the wake of his parents' divorce at the age of 13, this led to numerous short films, mini-docs and music videos over the years to follow.
The first short film Schuler Directed since moving to Los Angeles, 'The Offer', was produced in the Summer of 2017 and premiered on Film Shortage during the week of Halloween. 'The House Call', Schuler's latest short, began its festival run in the Winter of 2019 and is expected to be released online in late 2020. He has not yet made a feature-length film but commented on the prospect during an interview with 'Nightride FM', stating 'The goal is to be writing, directing and composing the original music for my own feature films. It's what I've been working toward my entire life, so I'm both excited and terrified to finally begin that process.'

The Sunstreak 
In February 2006, Schuler joined pop/rock band The Sunstreak. The band then went on to make history by selling nearly 25,000 copies of its independent self-titled debut on the Vans Warped Tour that year, gaining placement on multiple Billboard charts throughout the summer. This buzz caught the attention of Billy Mann, who then signed the group to management under his company, Stealth Entertainment. The band would soon tour the east coast with Daughtry, and support numerous groups like We The Kings, Gym Class Heroes, Paramore, Kevin Rudolph and Anberlin and appear at festivals such as The Bamboozle.

In the spring of 2009, the band self-released their 2nd full-length album (also produced/recorded/mixed by Schuler) titled "Once upon a lie". Originally containing 19 songs, the LP was then later released in a condensed, 11 song version by Merovingian Music/EMI Records. This marked the band's debut on a major label. The music video for the leading single "Until I met you" found its way to Number 6 on the MTV countdown and press included articles in publications such as Seventeen, Cosmo Girl, J-14 and other teen magazines/online outlets.

The band has not made any announcements regarding new material or tour plans since 2010.

The Bad Dreamers/Pretty in Pink 

Schuler is known for his love of synthwave/retrowave music. In 2011, he released a free album under the band name Pretty in Pink, followed by two live performances in Los Angeles and New York. In 2017, Schuler announced his new project, The Bad Dreamers, followed by the release of two new songs. "Songs About People Including Myself" was released on Jan 11, 2019 and includes 9 new tracks written, produced and mixed by David Schuler

Grammy nominations
In 2012, Pink's album The Truth about Love was nominated for a Grammy in the category of "Best pop album". Schuler was one of a shortlist of producers on the album, earning a nomination for his work.

In 2013, John Legend's album Love in the Future was nominated for R&B Album of the year. Schuler was nominated as he co-wrote the song "For the First Time" with John Legend and Billy Mann, a track that was released with iTunes versions of the album

References

External links
The Sunstreak

Record producers from New York (state)
Living people
Musicians from Rochester, New York
1982 births
Musicians from New York City
Musicians from Los Angeles
Record producers from California